Phaeographina is a genus of lichenized fungi in the family Graphidaceae. The genus was first described by J. Müller in 1882.

References

External links
Phaeographina at Index Fungorum

Ostropales
Lichen genera
Ostropales genera
Taxa named by Johannes Müller Argoviensis